Cardiocrinum cathayanum is a species of Chinese plants in the lily family, with large showy flowers. It is native to the Provinces of Anhui, Fujian, Henan, Hubei, Hunan, Jiangsu, Jiangxi, and Zhejiang.

Cardiocrinum cathayanum is similar to the more widespread and commonly cultivated C. giganteum, but it C. cathayanum generally has only 3-5 flowers per raceme, as compared to 10-16 flowers in C. giganteum.

References

External links
Flora of China Illustrations vol. 24,fig. 119, 1-4

Liliaceae
Flora of China
Plants described in 1925